Đắk Buk So is a rural commune of Tuy Đức District, Đắk Nông Province, Vietnam.

References

Populated places in Đắk Nông province
District capitals in Vietnam